The cut-throat finch (Amadina fasciata) is a common species of estrildid finch found throughout Africa; it is also known as the bearded finch, the ribbon finch, the cut throat, and the weaver finch.

The cut-throat finch has plumage that is pale, sandy brown with flecks of black all over.  They have a black-brown tail, a thick white chin and cheeks, and a chestnut brown patch on the belly.  The legs are a pink fleshy colour.  The adult male has a bright red band across its throat (thus the name "cut throat"), while the male juveniles have a slightly duller red band.

It has an estimated global extent of occurrence of 3,300,000 km2.  It is found throughout much of Sub-Saharan Africa, particularly in the Sahel, eastern and southern parts of the continent.

Reproduction
Cut-throat finches usually use nests constructed by other birds . A clutch usually consists of 3 to 6 white eggs, which hatch after an incubation period of 12 days.

Origin
Origin and phylogeny has been obtained by Antonio Arnaiz-Villena et al. Estrildinae may have originated in India and dispersed thereafter (towards Africa and Pacific Ocean habitats). Its closest relative is the red-headed finch.

Gallery

References

External links
 Cut-throat finch - Species text in The Atlas of Southern African Birds.

cut-throat finch
Birds of the Sahel
Birds of East Africa
cut-throat finch
cut-throat finch